Kaliabor Assembly constituency is one of the 126 assembly constituencies of  Assam a north east state of India. Kaliabor is also part of Kaliabor Lok Sabha constituency.

Members of Legislative Assembly
 1951: Lila Kanta Bara, Indian National Congress
 1957: Lila Kanta Bara, Indian National Congress
 1962: Lila Kanta Bara, Indian National Congress
 1967: A. Chandra, Sanghata Socialist Party
 1972: Golap Chandra Barua, Indian National Congress
 1978: Atil Chandra Goswami, Independent
 1983: Baloram Nag, Indian National Congress
 1985: Prafulla Kumar Mahanta, Independent
 1986 (By elections): Gunin Hazarika, Independent
 1991: Boloram Nag, Indian National Congress
 1996: Gunin Hazarika, Asom Gana Parishad
 2001: Gunin Hazarika, Asom Gana Parishad
 2006: Keshab Mahanta, Asom Gana Parishad
 2011: Keshab Mahanta, Asom Gana Parishad
 2016: Keshab Mahanta, Asom Gana Parishad
 2021: Keshab Mahanta, Asom Gana Parishad

Election results

2021 result

2016 results

2011 results

2006 results

2001 results

See also
 Kaliabor
 List of constituencies of Assam Legislative Assembly

References

External links 
 

Assembly constituencies of Assam
Jorhat district